BNM, or Bnm, may refer to:

Banca Naţională a Moldovei, the central bank of the Republic of Moldova
Bank Negara Malaysia, the central bank of Malaysia
Belau National Museum, museum in Palau
BNM Institute of Technology, an engineering education institution in Bangalore, India
bnm, the ISO 639-3 code for the Tanga language spoken in Cameroon and Equatorial Guinea
BNM, the National Rail code for Burnham railway station in the county of Berkshire, UK

See also